Kotha Jeevithalu is a 1981 Indian Telugu-language film directed by Bharathiraja. It is a remake of his own Tamil film Puthiya Vaarpugal (1979) and stars Suhasini. The film was a box office failure.

Plot

Cast 

Hari Prasad
Suhasini
Nutan Prasad
Rajya Lakshmi
Gummadi
Dr Siva Prasad
Poornima
Master Seenu
Master Sudhakar
Ravula Dasaradharammayya Gowd
M D S Reddy
Gummadi Srinivas
Ramana Rao
RamaKrishna
Rebala Srilakshmi
Vijaya, Satyavathi

Production 
Kotha Jeevithalu is the first Telugu film for both director Bharathiraja and actress Suhasini, and is a remake of the director's own Tamil film Puthiya Vaarpugal (1979).

Soundtrack 
The music was composed by Ilaiyaraaja.

References

External links 
 

1980s Telugu-language films
Films directed by Bharathiraja
Films scored by Ilaiyaraaja
Telugu remakes of Tamil films